The 2001 Cal State Northridge Matadors football team represented California State University, Northridge as an independent during the 2001 NCAA Division I-AA football season. Led by third-year head coach Jeff Kearin, Cal State Northridge compiled a record of 3–7. The Matadors played home games at North Campus Stadium in Northridge, California.

This was the last season for Cal State Northridge football. On November 20, 2001, the president of the university announced the termination of the football program after 40 seasons due to "looming budget concerns".

Schedule

Team players in the NFL
No Cal State Northridge players were selected in the 2002 NFL Draft.

The following finished their Cal State Northridge career in 2001, were not drafted, but played in the NFL.

References

Cal State Northridge
Cal State Northridge Matadors football seasons
Cal State Northridge Matadors football